Pratia is a formerly recognized genus of flowering plants in the family Campanulaceae, native to Asia, Australia and New Zealand. Along with other genera, such as Hypsela and Isotoma, it is now included in Lobelia.

Former species include:<ref>{{cite web | url=http://www.ars-grin.gov/cgi-bin/npgs/html/splist.pl?9819 | archive-url=https://archive.today/20120630001227/http://www.ars-grin.gov/cgi-bin/npgs/html/splist.pl?9819 | url-status=dead | archive-date=June 30, 2012 | title=Pratia | access-date=2008-02-23 | work=Germplasm Resources Information Network (GRIN) | publisher=United States Department of Agriculture, Agricultural Research Service, Beltsville Area }}</ref>Pratia angulata (G.Forst.) Hook.f., now Lobelia angulata, native to New Zealand Pratia concolor (R.Br.) Druce, now Lobelia concolor (poison pratia), native to Australia - New South Wales, Queensland, South Australia and VictoriaPratia pedunculata (R.Br.) Benth., now Lobelia pedunculata, native to Australia - New South Wales, South Australia, Tasmania and VictoriaPratia purpurascens (R.Br.) E.Wimm., now Lobelia purpurascens'', native to Australia

References

Lobelioideae
Groundcovers
Historically recognized angiosperm genera